Patrick Joseph Ruttledge (1 January 1892 – 8 May 1952) was an Irish Fianna Fáil politician who served as Minister for Local Government and Public Health from 1939 to 1941, Minister for Justice from 1933 to 1939, Minister for Lands and Fisheries from 1932 to 1933 and Vice President of Sinn Féin from 1923 to 1926. He served as a Teachta Dála (TD) from 1921 to 1951.

Born in Ballina, County Mayo, in 1892. He was educated at St Muredach's College and later at St. Enda's School, Rathfarnham, Dublin, run by Patrick Pearse. After studying at Trinity College Dublin, he qualified as a solicitor in 1918 and built up a practice in his home town.

During the Irish War of Independence he was active in the Irish Republican Army. He was a close friend of Seán Mac Diarmada, with whom he lived for some time. He also took part in local politics, becoming chair of Ballina Urban Council from 1919 to 1932 and chair of Mayo County Council from 1922 to 1926.

He was first elected to Dáil Éireann in 1921 as a Sinn Féin TD for Mayo North and West. He opposed the Anglo-Irish Treaty of 1921 and joined the Republican forces and was seriously injured during the Civil War. He was re-elected to the Dáil again in 1923 for Mayo North and in a further ten elections until 1951. In 1926, Ruttledge was a founder-member of Fianna Fáil.

He joined the cabinet of Éamon de Valera in 1932, serving as Minister for Lands and Fisheries, Minister for Justice and Minister for Local Government and Public Health, resigning in 1941 for the officially stated reason of "ill health". However, it is speculated by some historians that his actual motivation for the resignation was that he morally objected to the execution of IRA members by the Fianna Fáil government. During Ruttledge's tenure as Minister for Justice, he had executed three men for IRA activity but commuted the death sentences of eight other men. Ruttledge continued to work as TD for over a decade after his resignation despite his "ill health".

Ruttledge died in 1952 while still a member of the Dáil. He was described by the Irish Times as 'a gentle, kind and upright man'. He married Helena Roddy in 1920, and they had one son who died young and three daughters. A horsebreeder, he was a member of the Turf Club and won the Irish Derby with Mondragon in 1939.

References

External links

 

1892 births
1952 deaths
Early Sinn Féin TDs
Fianna Fáil TDs
Members of the 2nd Dáil
Members of the 3rd Dáil
Members of the 4th Dáil
Members of the 5th Dáil
Members of the 6th Dáil
Members of the 7th Dáil
Members of the 8th Dáil
Members of the 9th Dáil
Members of the 10th Dáil
Members of the 11th Dáil
Members of the 12th Dáil
Members of the 13th Dáil
Members of the 14th Dáil
Politicians from County Mayo
Irish Republican Army (1919–1922) members
Irish Republican Army (1922–1969) members
Ministers for Health (Ireland)
Ministers for Justice (Ireland)
People educated at St. Enda's School
Alumni of Trinity College Dublin